Elections to the Liverpool School Board were held on 19 November 1873. 

There were thirty-two candidates for the fifteen Board positions.

After the election, the composition of the school board was:

Elected

Not Elected

References

1873
1873 English local elections
1870s in Liverpool